Camille Flagey (1837–1898) was a French lichenologist who studied lichens in Algeria.

References

19th-century French botanists
French lichenologists
1837 births
1898 deaths